The Presidency of Andrés Manuel López Obrador began on 1 December 2018, when he became the 65th President of Mexico. Andrés Manuel López Obrador overcame Ricardo Anaya, José Antonio Meade, and Jaime Rodriguez Calderon in a landslide election on 1 July 2018. His election was the first since 1988 that a president-elect's political party has also won the outright majority in both the Senate and Chamber of Deputies. He was 65 at the time of his inauguration, making him the oldest man to become President of Mexico.

Events prior to presidency
López Obrador participated in the 2006 and 2012 elections, losing to Felipe Calderon (by a 0.6% margin) and Enrique Peña Nieto, respectively. After the loss in 2012, he left the Party of the Democratic Revolution to found the National Regeneration Movement (MORENA) which would later become a political party in 2014.

Timeline

López Obrador's political party MORENA would form the coalition Juntos Haremos Historia with left-wing Labor Party and socially conservative right-wing Social Encounter Party – attracting controversy with the latter. He would go on to face Ricardo Anaya, José Antonio Meade, and Jaime Rodriguez Calderon. On 1 July 2018, López Obrador won in a landslide defeat against all other candidates, managing to secure 53% of the popular vote against Anaya's 22%, Meade's 16%, and Rodriguez Calderon's 5%.

In the Congressional elections, the coalition managed to win the majority of seats in both the Senate and Chamber of Deputies. The coalition also managed to win 5 governorships, among them Mexico City's.

Following López Obrador's victory, he would go on to meet current President Enrique Peña Nieto at the National Palace. At the meeting he said that he would not travel with armed people in a break with what the Mexican presidency usually does.

He declared that he will take a 60% salary pay cut. From 22 October to 25 October, he held a nationwide referendum on whether or not the New International Airport for Mexico City was to be scrapped, citing that the project was rife with graft and a waste of taxpayer money. About 70% of the results voted against the continuation of the project. López Obrador insists on expanding the Santa Lucía Air Force Base instead.

International reaction
López Obrador's victory was met by various reactions around the world. Congratulations came from world politicians that included Canadian Prime Minister Justin Trudeau, Russian President Vladimir Putin and US President Donald Trump.

Personnel

Campaign team
At the helm of López Obrador's campaign team was Tatiana Clouthier, Alfonso Romo, and Yeidckol Polevnsky Gurwitz. The regional coordinators throughout the nation were Marcelo Ebrard, Bertha Luján (es), Ricardo Monreal, Julio Scherer Ibarra, and Rabindranath Salazar Solorio.

Transition team
Most of the people in López Obrador's campaign team joined his transition team in order to prepare for the inauguration and the subsequent 6-year presidential term that will last from 1 December 2018 to 30 September 2024.

Proposed cabinet

In December 2017, López Obrador released his cabinet listing, composed of 8 men and 8 women. He proposed dispersing the cabinet throughout the country's states, with the objective of “promoting development throughout the national territory,” while the Presidency, the Secretariat of National Defense, Secretariat of the Navy, the Secretariat of the Interior, Secretariat of Foreign Affairs, and the Secretariat of Finance and Public Credit remain in the capital.

In December 2017, he presented his proposed cabinet:

Olga Sánchez Cordero as Secretary of the Interior
Héctor Vasconcelos as Secretary of Foreign Affairs*
Carlos Manuel Urzúa Macías as Secretary of Finance
Maria Luisa Albores as Secretary of Social Development
Josefa González Blanco Ortiz Mena as Secretary of Environment
Rocío Nahle as Secretary of Energy
Graciela Márquez Colín as Secretary of Economy
Esteban Moctezuma Barragán as Secretary of Education
Víctor Villalobos as Secretary of Agriculture
Javier Jiménez Espriú as Secretary of Communications
Irma Eréndira Sandoval as Secretary of the Civil Service
Jorge Alcocer Varela as Secretary of Health
Luisa María Alcalde Lujan as Secretary of Labor
Román Meyer Falcón as Secretary of Agrarian Development and Urban Planning
Miguel Torruco Marqués as Secretary of Tourism
Alejandra Frausto Guerrero as Secretary of Culture

Replacements

Héctor Vasconcelos was replaced by Marcelo Ebrard on 5 July 2018.

Presidency

Inauguration
On 1 December 2018, Obrador was inaugurated at the Legislative Palace of San Lázaro at 11:00 am. He was accompanied from left to right by: Martí Batres Guadarrama (President of the Senate), Enrique Peña Nieto (Outgoing President), Porfirio Muñoz Ledo (President of the Chamber of Deputies), and Luis María Aguilar (President of the Supreme Court of Justice); guarded three cadets of each of the branches of the armed forces (one from the Heroic Military Academy, a female cadet of the Escuela Militar de Aviación and one of the Heroica Escuela Naval Militar). After the reception and announcement of the leader of the legislature, he pronounced the text contained in article 87 of the Constitution of Mexico. At the end of the phrase "the people have given me," he added the words "democratically". Then the transfer was made from the presidential sash, as indicated by the law, the president projection of delivery to the Congress and this to the new owner. Obrador was first to give a speech to the Congress since 2000, after the inauguration of Felipe Calderon. At the end of the speech, he was honored with the Himno Nacional Mexicano.

The foreign representation at the inauguration included the attendance of 14 heads of state and government:

 Felipe VI, King of Spain
 Miguel Díaz-Canel (President of Cuba)
 Evo Morales (President of Bolivia)
 Martín Vizcarra (President of Peru)
 Juan Orlando Hernández (President of Honduras)
 Jimmy Morales (President of Guatemala)
 Lenín Moreno (President of Ecuador)
 Iván Duque Márquez (President of Colombia)
 Brahim Gali (President of Sahrawi Arab Democratic Republic)
 Colville Young (Governor General of Belize)
 Julie Payette (Governor General of Canada)
 Danilo Medina (President of the Dominican Republic)
 Jovenel Moïse (President of Haiti)
 António Costa (Prime Minister of Portugal)

President of Venezuela Nicolás Maduro did not attend the inauguration ceremony, but did attend a reception in the National Palace. Representatives from 37 countries, including the United States, China, Singapore, Azerbaijan, Brazil, Russia, and Ukraine also attended.

Fulfilling a campaign promise, he opened Los Pinos to the public later on 1 December and simultaneously moved the presidential offices back to the National Palace.

After inauguration

Lopez Obrador gave his Primer Informe del Gobierno (State of the Union address) on September 1, 2019, before 400 legislators, governors, and business leaders. During his hour-and-a-half speech, he emphasized how he has eliminated a lot of corruption and helped the poor. The speech generated 125,000 tweets and 27,000,000 viewers.

Foreign policy

As of December 2019, he has not visited any foreign country since assuming office, often saying that "The best foreign policy is domestic policy". Despite this, in his first year, he had hosted multiple foreign leaders in Mexico City, including Pedro Sánchez of Spain in January and Miguel Diaz Canel of Cuba and Carlos Alvarado Quesada of Costa Rica in October.

During the 2019 Bolivian political crisis, President Evo Morales was granted the right of political asylum by Foreign Minister Marcelo Ebrard at the direction of Obrador. Obrador justified his actions in a press conference the following day, taking the position alongside other governments such as Cuba, Venezuela, and Argentina that Morales was the victim of a political coup d'état. Morales later went to Argentina, and the Bolivian government issued a warrant for his arrest on December 18. Days later, Bolivia deployed a large number of security forces outside the embassy and ambassador's residence in La Paz, and the Mexican government claimed they were intimidating, harassing, and photographing diplomats.

On July 8, 2020, he made his first foreign trip as President to Washington, D. C. where he met with President Donald Trump at the White House.

On November 18, 2021, President Joe Biden hosted Prime Minister Justin Trudeau of Canada and President Andrés Manuel López Obrador of Mexico at the White House for the first North American Leaders' Summit (NALS) since 2016.

In 2021 and 2022, López Obrador advocated for a regional union, comprising the nations of the Americas, resembling the European Union.

Military and security
Shortly after his inauguration, he dissolved the Estado Mayor Presidencial (Presidential Guard), an institution charged with protecting and safeguarding the President of Mexico and the First Lady of Mexico. In December 2018, López Obrador ordered the creation of a truth commission to re-examine one of the country's most notorious unsolved crimes: the kidnapping and presumed murder of 43 trainee teachers who disappeared after they were attacked by cartel gunmen and corrupt police officers. On March 1, 2019, Obrador said that he will open up the General National Archives to show how intelligence agencies, particularly the CISEN, targeted activists and opposition groups during the Dirty War. During the presidency of López Obrador, the traditional Revolution Day civil-military-athletic parade on 20 November was reinstated that same year (2019) after 5 years.

Before becoming President, Obrador campaigned on a promise to take the military off the streets of Mexico. In keeping with this promise, he released a plan to create a Mexican National Guard under control of the military and the Secretariat of Security and Civilian Protection (which was itself established by Obrador) and would be in charge of "preventing and combating crime". It was the merger of elite parts of the Federal police, Military police, Navy, Chief of Staff's Guard and other top Mexican Security agencies Obrador stated that the creation of a new National Guard would be critical to solving Mexico's ongoing security crisis. On 28 February, the Congress of the Union voted to approve a 60,000-member agency, which was officially established on 30 June 2019. By early 2020, Obrador restored the Naval Infantry Corps' role in fighting drug cartels, and he relied on the military for tasks such as law enforcement and construction.

Ovidio Guzmán López, a high-ranking member of the Sinaloa Cartel and son of Joaquín "El Chapo" Guzmán was briefly arrested in Culiacán by members of the National Guard in October 2019, setting off an operation which resulted in several deaths and Guzmán's release by authorities. Hours later, Ovidio Guzmán was freed, and President Obrador supported the decision in order to "prevent more bloodshed" as well as "a massacre".

Drug war
One of his campaign promises in relation to the Mexican Drug War was a controversial "strategy for peace": a program to give amnesty to all Mexicans involved in the production and trafficking of drugs. It was proposed as a way to stop the drug trade and the turf violence that spread as a result as well as act as a deterrent to other people from following that path, particularly low-income young people and poor farmers. President Obrador pointed out that contrary to his proposed plan, past approaches failed because they were based on a misunderstanding of the core problem, which according to him, is the country's social disparities that resulted from economic policies of past presidencies in the years prior that caused the drug problem in the first place which in turn have turned the country into a hotbed of the illegal drug trade globally. On 30 January 2019, President Obrador declared the end of the Mexican war on drugs, stating that he will now focus on reducing spending and will direct military/police/National Guard efforts on armed gasoline theft rings (locally known as huachicolero) that have been stealing more than 70 thousand barrels of oil, diesel and gasoline daily from the nation's gas pipelines.

Economic policy

Lithium reserves
In April 2022, the Mexican parliament passed a law, prohibiting private companies from obtaining licences for lithium extraction.
In February 2023, the president signed a decree nationalising the lithium reserves of Mexico, declaring it the property of the Mexican nation. López Obrador noted the enormous importance of the natural ressource for the rechargeable battery industry and plans to cooperate with Bolivia and Peru in the technological sphere, as well as to adopt the Bolivian model of lithium mining, wherein companies have to commit to establish a complete value creation chain.

See also
Opinion polling for the 2018 Mexican general election

References

Andrés Manuel López Obrador
Presidencies
2018 establishments in Mexico
Executive branch of the government of Mexico
2010s in Mexican politics
2020s in Mexican politics
Lopez Obrador